Helvig may refer to:

Helvig of Schauenburg (1398–1436), duchess of Schleswig
Helvig of Schleswig (died 1374), Danish queen consort

People with the surname
Amalia von Helvig (1776–1831), German-Swedish artist and writer
Christoph Helvig (1581–1617), German chronologist and historian

See also
Helwig
Hellwig